Ashish Kumar (born 10 December 1988) is an Indian cricketer. He made his first-class debut for Jharkhand in the 2014–15 Ranji Trophy on 28 December 2014. He made his List A debut for Jharkhand in the 2017–18 Vijay Hazare Trophy on 11 February 2018.

References

External links
 

1988 births
Living people
Indian cricketers
Jharkhand cricketers
People from Lohardaga district